Daon (pronounced day-on) is an international biometrics and identity assurance software company founded in 1999 by Irish entrepreneur Dermot Desmond. The name, Daon, was chosen because it stems from the Celtic word for human being, . Daon is headquartered just miles outside of Washington, DC in Fairfax, VA. Daon also has major operations in Dublin, located in the International Financial Services Center (IFSC). It has an additional office in Canberra, Australia.

History 
In 2006, Daon and the American Association of Airport Executives (AAAE) entered into a joint venture to create the Security Biometric Clearing Network (SBCN) to provide services for biometric identity management, including enrollment, background checking, secure biometric and biographic information storage, and card issuance.

In August 2008 Daon acquired software assets and associated personnel for physical security interconnectivity from Enterprise Air, a New York-based provider of solutions for the physical security market.

In July 2019, Daon announced the launch of its IdentityX Digital Onboarding 2.0, which sets a new industry standard for all-digital customer onboarding.

Overview 
Daon's products include IdentityX (their flagship biometric mobile authentication platform), DaonEngine, DaonEnroll, DaonAnalytics, and Credential Connect. Daon’s biometric products integrate with preexisting IT platforms and applications to manage identity life-cycles. Daon serves multiple markets including mobile authentication, border management, civil ID, traveler ID, employee credentialing, and access control. Their software is used worldwide at airports and international borders and supports U.S. Registered Traveler airports.

IdentityX 
IdentityX is a platform that allows users to authenticate themselves on any mobile device using biometrics instead of a password. IdentityX uses facial recognition, voice recognition, fingerprint, and more to prove a user is who they claim to be. In 2015, IdentityX was one of the first products to be certified by the FIDO alliance, an industry consortium in which PayPal and Lenovo are among the founders. Also in 2015, Daon’s IdentityX won NACUSO’s Next Big Idea competition as well as the Best in Show award from the CUNA Technology Council.

See also 
 Dermot Desmond

References

External links 
 Company Website

Biometrics software
Software companies established in 1999
Companies based in Fairfax, Virginia
Software companies of the United States
1999 establishments in Ireland